George Humbert (born Umberto Gianni; July 29, 1880 – May 8, 1963) was an Italian-born American actor who appeared in more than 100 films between 1918 and the 1950s. He emigrated to the United States as a steerage passenger on board the Italian steamer Sannio, which sailed from Genoa, Italy and arrived at the Port of New York in June 1907; he was examined by the U.S. immigration service on Ellis Island and allowed to enter the United States legally. He became a United States citizen in 1933.

Humbert was a nephew of Italian actor Ernesto Rossi, and he served as an ensign in the Royal Italian Navy. The Duke of Abruzzi, after hearing Humbert perform, recommended that he enter the Florence Music Conservatory. After Humbert performed in opera in Italy, he joined the San Carlo Opera Company in the United States.

In addition to his acting, Humbert coached other actors, including Gloria Swanson and George Beban, in mannerisms of Italian people.

Selected filmography

References

External links

1880 births
1963 deaths
American male film actors
Italian emigrants to the United States
Actors from Florence
20th-century American male actors